John Evershed CIE FRS FRAS (26 February 1864 – 17 November 1956) was an English astronomer.  He was the first to observe radial motions in sunspots, a phenomenon now known as the Evershed effect.

Biography
Evershed was born in Gomshall, Surrey to John and Sophia (née Price) Evershed. He made the discovery which bears his name while at Kodaikanal Observatory in 1909. After retirement in 1923 he set up a private observatory at Ewhurst, Surrey and built a large spectroheliograph of special design and another with high-dispersion liquid prism. He continued to study the wave-lengths of H and K lines in prominences, giving values of the solar rotation at high levels in different latitudes and at different phases of the solar cycle. Work continued until 1950 when the observatory closed and he presented some of his instruments to the Royal Greenwich Observatory at Herstmonceux. In the autumn of 1890 was a founding member of the British Astronomical Association. He directed its Solar Spectroscopy Section (1893-1899) and Spectroscopic Section (1924-1926).

Awards and honours
In 1894 Evershed was elected a Fellow of the Royal Astronomical Society, in 1918 he was awarded the Gold Medal of the Royal Astronomical Society. He was elected a Fellow of the Royal Society in May, 1915. The Evershed crater on the Moon is named in his honor. He was awarded as a Companion of the Indian Empire on his retirement in 1923.

Personal life
Evershed was married to fellow astronomer Mary Acworth Orr Evershed, with whom he co-authored some work. He died in Ewhurst, Surrey on 17 November 1956.
He also had interest in lepidoptera and other insects. W. H. Evans described a butterfly and named it after Evershed(Thoressa evershedi-Evans, 1910) as the first specimen was collected by Evershed. In 2015 his archive was acquired by the Science Museum, London.

Bibliography

Monthly Notices of the Royal Astronomical Society
Report of his Observatory. vol. 94 (1934), p. 318
Report of his Observatory. vol. 95 (1935), p. 379
Report of his Observatory. vol. 96 (1936), p. 337
Report of his Observatory. vol. 97 (1937), p. 327
Report of his Observatory. vol. 98 (1938), p. 296
Report of his Observatory. vol. 100 (1940), p. 298
Report of his Observatory. vol. 102 (1942), p. 94
Report of his Observatory. vol. 103 (1943), p. 84
Report of his Observatory. vol. 105 (1945), p. 122
Report of his Observatory. vol. 106 (1946), p. 59
Report of his Observatory. vol. 107 (1947), p. 81
Report of his Observatory. vol. 108 (1948), p. 78
Report of his Observatory. vol. 109 (1949), p. 177
Report of his Observatory. vol. 110 (1950), p. 164
Report of his Observatory. vol. 111 (1951), p. 216

Nature
The Chromosphere. vol. 37 (1887), p. 79
The Corona Spectrum. vol. 48 (1893), p. 268
A Remarkable Flight of Birds. vol. 52 (1895), p. 508
The Corona Spectrum. vol. 56 (1897), p. 444
Solar Radiation. vol. 58 (1898), p. 619
Absorption Markings in “K” Spectroheliograms.  vol. 86 (1911), p. 348
Absorption Markings in “K” Spectroheliograms.  vol. 87 (1911), p. 111
Butterfly Migration in Relation to Mimicry. vol. 89 (1912), p. 659
Luminous Halos surrounding Shadows of Heads. vol. 90 (1913), p. 592
The Green Flash. vol. 95 (1915), p. 286
A Question of Albedo. vol. 96 (1915), p. 369
Scarcity of Wasps in Kashmir in 1916. vol. 99 (1917), p. 185
Observations of Nova Aquilæ in India. vol. 102 (1918), p. 105
The Magnetic Storm of August 11–12, 1919. vol. 104 (1920), p. 436
Terrestrial Magnetic Disturbances and Sun-spots. vol. 108 (1921), p. 566
Optical Definition and Resolving Power. vol. 110 (1922), p. 179
The Green Flash at Sunset. vol. 111 (1923), p. 13
An Uncommon Type of Cloud. vol. 112 (1923), p. 901
Photographic Studies of Solar Prominences. 116 (1925), p. 30
Letter to Editor. vol. 116 (1925), p. 395
The ‘Green Flash’. vol. 120 (1927), p. 876

Journal of the British Astronomical Association,
The Distribution of the Solar Prominence of 1891. vol. 2 (1892), p. 174
Some recent attempts to photograph the Faculae and Prominences. vol. 3 (1893), p. 269
The Cause of the Darkness of Sun Spots. vol. 7 (1897), p. 190
A New Arrangement of Prisms for a Solar Prominence Spectroscope. vol. 7 (1897), p. 331

The Observatory
The Flash-Spectrum. vol. 25 (1902), p. 198
The Flash-Spectrum. vol. 25 (1902), p. 272
Sun-Spots and Magnetic Storms. vol. 27 (1904), p. 129
The Rumford Spectrograph of the Yerkes Observatory. vol. 27 (1904), p. 164
Sun-Spots and Solar Temperature. vol. 31 (1908), p. 462
Helium Absorption in the Sun. vol. 31 (1908), p. 212
Water-Vapour Lines in the Spot-Spectrum. vol. 32 (1909), p. 101
Sun-spots and the Solar Temperature. vol. 32 (1909), p. 135
Pressure in the Reversing Layer. vol. 32 (1909), p. 254
Radial Movement in Sun-spots. vol. 32 (1909), p. 291
Pressure in the Reversing Layer. vol. 32 (1909), p. 
Dante and Mediaeval Astronomy (with Evershed, M. A.). vol. 34 (1911), p. 440
Radium and the Chromosphere. vol. 35 (1912), p. 360
Some Problems of Astronomy (XIV The Displacement of the Lines of the Solar Spectrum Towards the Red). vol. 37 (1914), p. 124
The General Shift of Fraunhofer Lines Towards the Red. vol. 37 (1914), p. 388
Anomalous Dispersion in the Sun. vol. 39 (1916), p. 59
Large Prominences. vol. 39 (1916), p. 392
Anomalous Dispersion in the Sun. vol. 39 (1916), p. 432
The Einstein Effect and the Eclipse of 1919 May 29. vol. 40 (1917), p. 269
Day and Night "Seeing". vol. 40 (1917), p. 407
The Displacement of the Cyanogen Bands in the Solar Spectrum. vol. 41 (1918), p. 371
The Positive-on-Negative Method of Measuring Spectra. vol. 41 (1918), p. 443
The Displacement of the Solar Lines Reflected by Venus. vol. 42 (1919), p. 51
Calcium Clouds in the Milky Way. vol. 42 (191), p. 85
The Pulsation Theory of Cepheid Variables. vol. 42 (1919), p. 124
The Moon in Daylight. vol. 42 (1919), p. 339
Displacement of the Lines in the Solar Spectrum and Einstein's Prediction. vol. 43 (1920), p. 153
The Relativity Shift in the Solar Spectrum. vol. 44 (1921), p. 243
The Spectrum of Sirius. vol. 45 (1922), p. 296
The Einstein Effect in the Solar Spectrum. vol. 46 (1923), p. 299
Stationary Calcium in Space. vol. 47 (1924), p. 53
The Height of the Chromosphere. vol. 48 (1925), p. 45
The Height of the Chromosphere. vol. 48 (1925), p. 146
The Green Flash. vol. 49 (1926), p. 369
Recent Work at Arcetri (with Evershed, M. A.). vol. 55 (1932), p. 254
The Central Intensities of the Fraunhofer Lines. vol. 56 (1933), p. 275
The Problem of the Red Shift in the Solar Spectrum. vol. 60 (1937), p. 266
Obituary: George Ellery Hale. vol. 61 (1938), p. 163
Sunspots and Magnetic Storms. vol. 63 (1940), p. 47
The Magnetic Effect in Sunspot Spectra. vol. 65 (1944), p. 190
Spectrum Lines in Chromospheric Flares. vol. 68 (1948), p. 67
The Central Intensities of the Fraunhofer Lines. vol. 69 (1949), p. 109

References

External links
 J. Evershed @ Astrophysics Data System  

1864 births
1956 deaths
People from Gomshall
20th-century British astronomers
Recipients of the Gold Medal of the Royal Astronomical Society
Fellows of the Royal Society